Mottoware or motto ware refers to pottery decorated with text, such as:

 Measham#Measham teapots
 Torquay pottery